Lucie Škrobáková (born 4 January 1982) is a Czech athlete who competes in the 60 metres hurdles and 100 metres hurdles. She is the 2001 European junior bronze medallist, and took the silver medal at the 2009 European Indoor Championships. Her personal best times are 12.73 seconds and 7.95 s in the 100 and 60 metres hurdles respectively.

Junior career 
Škrobáková was born in Hodonín. As a junior athlete, she competed in the 400 metre hurdles at the 1999 World Youth Championships and the 100 metre hurdles at the 2000 World Junior Championships, but failed to reach the final round in either event. She then won the bronze medal at the 2001 European Junior Championships in a wind-assisted 13.30 s. Her personal best time in 2001, her last year as a junior, was 13.52 s, achieved in July 2001 in Jablonec nad Nisou.

Senior career 
In 2002 Škrobáková recorded 8.28 s in the 60 metre hurdles, in February, and 13.46 s in the 100 metre hurdles, in June. She competed at the European Indoor Championships and the European Championships, without reaching the final. In 2003, she lowered her personal best time to 13.15 s at a meet in Bydgoszcz. Further improvements came in 2004, when she improved to 8.07 s and 13.08 s in the 60 and 100 metre hurdles. She competed at the World Indoor Championships as well as the Olympic Games, but again she failed to progress past the first round. She did reach the semi-final at the 2005 European Indoor Championships, and during the summer of 2005 she improved her personal best slightly, recording 13.07 s in June in Prague.

Over the next three seasons, she was consistent in the 60 metre hurdles, but struggled in the 100 metre distance. She recorded 13.27 s in 2006 and 13.46 s in 2007, competing without success at the 2006 European Championships. However, in 2008 she managed to set a new national record, with 12.93 s in July in Tábor. She also competed at the 2008 Olympic Games. In 2009, she competed at the 2009 European Indoor Championships. After 8.07 in the heats and 8.05 s in the semi-final, she took the silver medal, behind Eline Berings but ahead of reigning champion Derval O'Rourke and Christina Vukicevic. Her time of 7.95 s was a new national indoor record. Škrobáková improved her national record in the 100 metre hurdles with 12.73 s in July 2009 in Kladno (at that moment her time ranked 4th among world hurdlers for 2009 season).

Personal life 
Born with the name Škrobáková, she married and for some years bore the last name Martincová. After divorcing, she reverted to her birth name.

Competition record

References 

1982 births
Living people
People from Hodonín
Czech female hurdlers
Athletes (track and field) at the 2004 Summer Olympics
Athletes (track and field) at the 2008 Summer Olympics
Athletes (track and field) at the 2012 Summer Olympics
Olympic athletes of the Czech Republic
Sportspeople from the South Moravian Region